Theriiformes is a clade of mammals. The term was coined by Timothy B. Rowe in his doctoral dissertation, and is defined as the clade formed by the most recent common ancestor of multituberculates and therians, and all its descendants.

The cladogram below follows Luo et al. (2016):

References

 
Taxa named by Timothy B. Rowe